Pak-Tong (or Tong-Pak) is an Oceanic language of the Pak and Tong islands of Manus Province, Papua New Guinea.

References

External links 
 Audio recordings and written materials for Pak are archived with Kaipuleohone

Manus languages
Languages of Manus Province